Ambia naumanni is a moth in the family Crambidae. It was described by Wolfgang Speidel and Dieter Stüning in 2005. It is found in Yunnan, China.

The wingspan is 15–17 mm. The ground colour of the forewings is yellowish with white transverse fasciae, bordered by blackish brown. The hindwings are similar to the forewings. Adult have been recorded on wing from mid-June to the beginning of September.

References

Moths described in 2005
Musotiminae
Moths of Asia